Bloomberg Tradebook, LLC., the agency broker of Bloomberg L.P., serves global investment advisors, money managers, hedge funds, proprietary desks and broker dealers, with access to global trading venues, proprietary trading algorithms, execution consulting services, pre-and-post trade analytics and independent research. Through a trading platform integrated with the Bloomberg Professional service, Bloomberg Tradebook provides its customers with direct market access to more than 110 markets and global trading solutions for equities, futures, and options across 44 countries, as well as 43 currency pairs. Tradebook offers over 55 proprietary algorithms designed for each asset class and market.

History

Bloomberg Tradebook was founded in 1996 by Kevin Foley as an electronic communication network (ECN) and an alternative trading system (ATS) for U.S. equities.  In 1999 Tradebook began offering electronic trading for Asian equity markets and in 2000 the European equity markets became available.  In 2002 Tradebook launched Futures trading, followed by US Listed options in 2006 and an FX marketplace in 2007.

In 2010, Bloomberg Tradebook developed B-Dark, an algorithm to provide information to traders about where their orders were being filled, even for trades occurring in private electronic transaction networks, or dark pools.

Glenn Lesko became chief executive officer of Bloomberg Tradebook in March 2015. He left the firm after a little more than two years. His final day at Bloomberg Tradebook was on March 22. Ray Tierney, global head of trading solutions, also departed the firm. Tierney had been CEO and president of Tradebook from 2010 to 2015. According to reports, "Bloomberg remains committed to the business, and a successor to Tierney will be announced shortly." Despite the departures, the firm was recognized in August 2017 for the third straight year as the "best agency broker" by Waters Technology.  

In November 2011, Bloomberg Tradebook was ranked a top equity trading broker based on interval volume-weighted average price (VWAP) and arrival price in an Elkins McSherry study of more than 2,000 global brokers.

Execution Consulting

In 2011, Bloomberg Tradebook started offering execution consulting services. Execution consulting is an advisory service that uses analytics and knowledge of the market place, specifically execution venues, to improve trading efficiency and reduce implicit trading costs, or execution fees.

Bloomberg Tradebook has a staff of 35 execution consultants globally that take accredited courses ranging from professional consulting through systems, pre and post-trade and technical analysis.

Independent Research Providers

Bloomberg Tradebook provides clients with consultative services for research and access to independent third-party research. Tradebook partners with independent providers offering fundamental and industry-specific research.

References

Tradebook